Mildred Johnson Library is an academic library on the campus of North Dakota State College of Science (NDSCS) in Wahpeton, North Dakota. 

The library serves 2,987 students and provides access to approximately 12,369 physical books and 84,167 digital media items. Because NDSCS is part of the Tri-College University (TCU) consortium, Mildred Johnson Library participates in the TCU Library Cooperative Agreement and makes resources available to TCU students, faculty, and staff.

The library's archival collection spans 120 years (1903–2023) and encompasses the history of the college, one of the oldest community colleges in the United States.

Other collection highlights include: The Fritz Scholder Collection (books, a DVD, and print material related to the 1995 exhibition of Shoulder’s work “Master of the Southwest” held in NDSCS's Stern Cultural Center and to the artist’s prolific career), the Louise Erdrich Collection (a curated collection of the author’s books, articles and short stories, as well as reviews of and excerpts from her books), and the Gewalt Oriental Print Collection (donated by a NDSCS alumnus).

Designed by Bernard H. Hillyer Associates, the building was dedicated on March 19, 1970. The  design includes both collaborative work spaces and individual study spaces. Prior to construction of the Mildred Johnson Library building, NDSCS's library was housed in Old Main.

The library was named for Mildred Johnson, a pioneer of North Dakota law and the first woman on the North Dakota State Board of Higher Education.

References

External links 

ODIN: NDSCS's Mildred Johnson Library
WorldCat: NDSCS's Mildred Johnson Library

Wahpeton, North Dakota
University and college academic libraries in the United States
University and college buildings completed in 1970
Buildings and structures in Richland County, North Dakota
Libraries in North Dakota